Archibald Gracie (1755–1829) was a merchant in New York.

Archibald Gracie may also refer to:
 Archibald Gracie III (1832–1864), Confederate general
 Archibald Gracie IV (1859–1912), writer and survivor of the Titanic